Stonor Park is a historic country house and private deer park situated in a valley in the Chiltern Hills at Stonor, about  north of Henley-on-Thames in Oxfordshire, England, close to the county boundary with Buckinghamshire. The house has a 12th-century private chapel. The remains of a prehistoric stone circle are in the grounds. It is the ancestral home and seat of the Stonor family, Baron Camoys.  The current Lord Camoys is William Stonor.

Setting
The house nestles in the Chiltern Hills. Behind the main house, there is a walled garden in an Italianate style on a rising slope, providing good views. Around the house is a park with a herd of fallow deer. Around the park are Almshill Wood, Balham's Wood and Kildridge Wood. The house and garden are open to the public.

History

Stonor House has been the home of the Stonor family for more than eight centuries. In the house are displays of family portraits, tapestries, bronzes and ceramics. The house has a 12th-century private chapel built of flint and stone, with an early brick tower.

The house was probably begun after 1280, when Sir Richard Stonor (1250–1314) married his second wife, Margaret Harnhull.

During and after the English Reformation the Stonor family and many other local gentry were recusants. In 1581, the Jesuit priests Edmund Campion and Robert Parsons lived and worked at Stonor Park, and Campion's Decem Rationes was printed here on a secret press. On 4 August 1581, a raid on the house found the press. Campion and Parsons had left a few days earlier, but the elderly Lady Cecily Stonor, her son John, the Jesuit priest William Hartley, the printers and four servants were taken prisoner, and in 1585, Hartley was exiled. Despite further prosecutions and fines the Stonors remained Roman Catholic throughout the 17th and 18th centuries, and enabled many local villagers to remain Roman Catholic by allowing them to attend Mass at their private chapel. Between 1716 and 1756, John Talbot Stonor, Vicar Apostolic of the Midland District, used Stonor Park as his headquarters.

The Stonor family's steadfast adherence to Roman Catholicism throughout the reformation led to their marginalization and relative impoverishment in subsequent centuries. This has inadvertently resulted in the preservation of the house in a relative unspoiled and unimproved state.

Stone circle
The house was built on the site of a prehistoric stone circle or henge and this has given it its name. The remains of the circle are still visible with one stone incorporated into the south-east corner of the chapel. The stones are a mixture of sarsens and puddingstone. The current stone positions are the result of re-positioning during 17th-century landscaping and 20th-century reconstruction. The site is listed as a folly in the Sites and Monuments Record (SMR) (PRN 2064)).

Media appearances
Stonor has been used as a filming location including; The Pumaman (1980), The Living Daylights (1987), film version (1987), One Foot in the Grave, Endeavour  (2019), A Christmas Carol (2019), and Antiques Roadshow (2020).

Bibliography

References

External links
 Stonor official website
 AboutBritain.com information
 Great British Gardens information
 Tour UK information
 The Living Daylights information
 Stonor Cricket Club official website

Gardens in Oxfordshire
Henley-on-Thames
Country houses in Oxfordshire
Parks and open spaces in Oxfordshire
Tourist attractions in Oxfordshire
Grade I listed houses in Oxfordshire
Historic house museums in Oxfordshire
Stone circles in Oxfordshire
History of Oxfordshire
Grade II* listed parks and gardens in Buckinghamshire